Complete economic integration is the final stage of economic integration.  After complete economic integration, the integrated units have no or negligible control of economic policy, including full monetary union and complete or near-complete fiscal policy harmonisation.

Complete economic integration is most common within countries, rather than within supranational institutions. An example of this are the original thirteen colonies of the United States of America, which can be viewed as a series of highly integrated quasi-autonomous nation states. In this example it is true that complete economic integration results in a federalist system of governance as it requires political union to function as, in effect, a single economy.

Complete economic integration

Complete economic integration is required because for an economic union to be most effective it is necessary for all provinces to be at the same stage of the economic cycle. Although provinces is a narrow description as within a specific geographic area there is a much greater amount of mini-economies, all in different stages of the economic cycle; it is in theory possible for a single town to be in recession/boom whilst another is experiencing the opposite. In a practical sense it is best for as many of these economic microcosms to be at the same stage of the economic cycle as possible as it results in government policy having its effectiveness maximized, whether it be through the employment of fiscal or monetary policy.

To achieve economic harmonization requires increasing central control to pursue an economic area wide policy of inflation competence and stability promotion. Though this is often viewed as a loss of provincial political sovereignty it is necessary to remove disparities and thus unfair advantages with certain firms across the economic area to provide the best conditions possible for the promotion of competition and therefore economic efficiency.

See also 
 Fiscal union, the penultimate step towards complete economic integration

Economic integration